KLBL (101.5 FM, "Kool 101.5") is a radio station broadcasting a classic hits format. Licensed to Malvern, Arkansas, United States, it serves the Hot Springs, Arkansas and Hot Springs Village, Arkansas area. The station is currently owned by US Stations, LLC.

History
On December 7, 2016, KHRK was sold from Central Arkansas Radio Group, LLC to US Stations, LLC and changed their format from classic hits to classic country branded as "101.5 The Bull".  "The Bull" branding was formerly held on 104.5 Pearcy.  The classic hits format was moved to 101.9 Mountain Pine and 104.5 Pearcy.

On December 14, 2016, KHRK changed their call letters to KLBL.

References

External links

LBL
Radio stations established in 1991
1991 establishments in Arkansas
Classic hits radio stations in the United States